Stationary may refer to:

Mathematics
 Stationary point
 Stationary process
 Stationary state

Meteorology
 A stationary front is a weather front that is not moving

Physics
 A time-invariant system quantity, such as a constant position or temperature
 A steady state physical process, such as a vibration at constant amplitude and frequency or a steady fluid flow
 A stationary wave is a standing wave
 Stationary spacetime in general relativity

Other uses
 "Stationary", a song from Copacetic (Knuckle Puck album)
 a common misspelling of "stationery", meaning office supplies